Massimo Marchiori (Padua, 1970) is an Italian mathematician and computer scientist.

Biography
In July, 2004, he was awarded the TR35 prize by Technology Review (the best 35 researchers in the world under the age of 35).

He is Professor in Computer Science at the University of Padua, and Research Scientist at MIT’s Computer Science and Artificial Intelligence Laboratory (CSAIL) in the World Wide Web Consortium.

He was the creator of HyperSearch, a search engine where the results were based not only on single page ranks, but on the relationship between single pages and the rest of the Web. Afterwards, Google co-founders Larry Page and Sergey Brin cited HyperSearch when they introduced PageRank.

He has been chief editor of the world standard for privacy on the Web (P3P), and co-author of the companion APPEL specification.

Initiator of the Query Languages effort at W3C (see for instance QL'98), he started the XML-Query  project, deemed to develop the corresponding world standard for querying XML (XQuery), finally providing the due integration between the Web and the database world.

He co-developed the first version of the Web Ontology Language (OWL) standard.

In April 2010 he became the Chief Technology Officer of Atomium Culture.

He was the creator of the social search engine Volunia, launched on February 2012. On 8 June 2012 Marchiori announced, with an open letter, that he had been excluded from the CTO position in the company "because someone else wants to do it instead of me. This person wants to decide everything, without me. And so, he put himself into my shoes, commanding me to step aside".

He created Negapedia, the negative version of Wikipedia.

References

External links

Technology Review award
The HyperSearch paper
 

Living people
1970 births
Chief technology officers
Italian computer scientists
University of Padua alumni
Academic staff of the University of Padua